Zhu Yingwen (born September 9, 1981, in Shanghai) is a female Olympic medal-winning swimmer from the People's Republic of China, who competed at the 2004 Olympic Games in Athens.

Along with Xu Yanwei, Yang Yu, and Pang Jiaying, she was part of China's 4 × 200 m freestyle relay team, which won the silver medal, beaten by the US relay team.

She was also part of China's 4 × 100 m women's freestyle relay team and 4 × 100 m women's medley relay team. China reached the final in both of these events but did not win a medal.

Zhu competed as an individual in the 50m freestyle event, but did not progress beyond the heat stage.

References

External links
 databaseOlympic.com page
 Chinese Olympic Committee page

1981 births
Living people
World record setters in swimming
Olympic silver medalists for China
Olympic swimmers of China
Swimmers from Shanghai
Swimmers at the 2004 Summer Olympics
Swimmers at the 2008 Summer Olympics
Chinese female freestyle swimmers
World Aquatics Championships medalists in swimming
Medalists at the FINA World Swimming Championships (25 m)
Asian Games medalists in swimming
Swimmers at the 2002 Asian Games
Medalists at the 2004 Summer Olympics
Olympic silver medalists in swimming
Universiade medalists in swimming
Asian Games gold medalists for China
Medalists at the 2002 Asian Games
Universiade silver medalists for China
Medalists at the 2007 Summer Universiade